The Navigium Isidis or Isidis Navigium (trans. the vessel of Isis) was an annual ancient Roman religious festival in honor of the goddess Isis, held on March 5. The festival outlived Christian persecution by Theodosius (391) and Arcadius' persecution against the Roman religion (395).

In the Roman Empire, it was still celebrated in Italy at least until the year 416. In Egypt, it was suppressed by Christian authorities in the 6th century.

The Navigium Isidis celebrated Isis' influence over the sea and served as a prayer for the safety of seafarers and, eventually, of the Roman people and their leaders. It consisted of an elaborate procession, including Isiac priests and devotees with a wide variety of costumes and sacred emblems, carrying a model ship from the local Isis temple to the sea or to a nearby river.

Modern carnival resembles the festival of the Navigium Isidis, and some scholars argue that they share the same origin (via carrus navalis, meaning naval wagon, i.e. float – later becoming car-nival). Many elements of Carnival were in turn appropriated in the Corpus Christi festival, most prominently in the Iberian Peninsula (Spain and Portugal).

See also
 Mysteries of Isis
 Foreign influences on Pompeii

Notes

References
Alföldi, Andreas (1937) A Festival of Isis in Rome under the Christian Emperors of the IVth Century, Budapest
Forrest, M. Isidora (2001) Isis magic: cultivating a relationship with the goddess of 10,000 names
Griffiths, J. Gwyn (1975) The Isis-book: Metamorphoses, Book 11, chapter Commentary pp. 111–346
di Cocco, Giampaolo (2007) Alle origini del Carnevale: Mysteria isiaci e miti cattolici (Florence: Pontecorboli)
Haase, Wolfgang and Temporini, Hildegard (1986) Aufstieg und Niedergang der römischen Welt, Volume 16, Part 3
Rudwin, Maximilian J. (1919) The Origin of the German Carnival Comedy in The Journal of English and Germanic Philology Vol. 18, No. 3 (Jul., 1919), pp. 402–454
Streete, Gail Corrington (2000) ‘An Isis Aretalogy from Kyme in Asia Minor, First Century B.C.E’, in Religions of Late Antiquity in Practice, ed. by Richard Valantasi (Princeton: Princeton University Press), pp. 369-384

Further reading
Brady, Thomas A. (1938) Reviewed work(s): A Festival of Isis in Rome under the Christian Emperors of the Fourth Century by Andrew Alföldi, in The Journal of Roman Studies Vol. 28, Part 1 (1938), pp. 88–90
Rademacher, Carl (1932) Carnival in Hastings ERE 3, pp. 225–9

Roman festivals of Isis
Processions in ancient Rome
March observances